Ostendorff is a surname. Notable people with the surname include:

 Friedrich Ostendorff (born 1953), German politician
 Werner Ostendorff (1903–1945), German SS-general during World War II